Igor Aleksandrovich Rudakov (born 8 October 1934) is a Russian coxswain who competed for the Soviet Union in the 1960, 1964, 1968, and in the 1972 Summer Olympics.

He was born in Leningrad. In 1960 he was the coxswain of the Soviet boat that won the silver medal in the coxed pair event. He was also the cox of the Soviet boat that finished fourth in the coxed four competition. Rudakov competed at the 1961 European Rowing Championships with the coxed four and won silver. At the inaugural 1962 World Rowing Championships in Lucerne, he won bronze with both the coxed pair and the coxed four. At the 1963 European Rowing Championships, he won bronze with the coxed four. At the 1964 European Rowing Championships, he won silver with the coxed pair. Later that year, he finished fourth with the Soviet boat at the coxed pair competition at the 1964 Summer Olympics. At the 1965 European Rowing Championships, he won silver with the coxed pair.

At the 1968 Summer Olympics, he helped the Soviet boat to qualify for the B final of the coxed pair event, but the team did not compete in their last race. At the 1969 European Rowing Championships, he won silver with the eight. At the 1971 European Rowing Championships, he won silver with the coxed four. His last Olympic appearance was at the 1972 Summer Olympics; he coxed the Soviet boat in the coxed four competition where the team finished fourth. At the 1974 World Rowing Championships, he won silver with the coxed four at age 40. At the 1975 World Rowing Championships, he won silver with the eight.

References 

1934 births
Living people
Soviet male rowers
Coxswains (rowing)
Olympic rowers of the Soviet Union
Rowers at the 1960 Summer Olympics
Rowers at the 1964 Summer Olympics
Rowers at the 1968 Summer Olympics
Rowers at the 1972 Summer Olympics
Olympic silver medalists for the Soviet Union
Olympic medalists in rowing
World Rowing Championships medalists for the Soviet Union
Medalists at the 1960 Summer Olympics
European Rowing Championships medalists